Fredericksburg is the seat of Gillespie County, in the U.S. state of Texas. As of the 2010 Census, this city had a population of 10,530.

Fredericksburg was founded in 1846 and named after Prince Frederick of Prussia. Old-time German residents often referred to Fredericksburg as Fritztown, a nickname that is still used in some businesses. It is approximately eighty miles west from Greater Austin. This city is also notable as the home of Texas German, a dialect spoken by the first generations of German settlers who initially refused to learn English. Fredericksburg shares many cultural characteristics with New Braunfels, which had been established by Prince Carl of Solms-Braunfels the previous year. Fredericksburg is the birthplace of Fleet Admiral Chester Nimitz. It is the sister city of Montabaur, Germany. On October 14, 1970, the Fredericksburg Historic District was added to the National Register of Historic Places in Texas.

Geography

Fredericksburg is located east of the center of Gillespie County at  (30.274058, −98.871822).

Enchanted Rock
Enchanted Rock offers 8.4 miles of hiking trails, camping, picnicking, rock climbing, and other outdoor activities. It is one of the largest batholiths (underground rock formation uncovered by erosion) in the United States, and was declared a National Natural Landmark in 1970. In 1994, the State of Texas opened it as Enchanted Rock State Natural Area after adding facilities. The same year, Enchanted Rock was added to the National Register of Historic Places.

Balanced Rock

The natural wonder stone pillar, precariously balanced on its small tip. It fell prey to vandals, who dynamited it off its base in April 1986.

Cross Mountain

The first known record of Cross Mountain (elevation ) was in 1847 by Dr. Ferdinand von Roemer.  Native Americans used the location to signal each other about intrusions into their territory.  The area was part of settler Dr. John Christian Durst's  allotment.  Durst found a timber cross on the mountain, indicating that Spanish missionaries had once used the site.  Durst named the place "Kreuzberg" or Cross Mountain.  In 1849, Father George Menzel erected a new cross.  In 1946, St. Mary's Catholic Church erected a metal and concrete cross.  The mountain has been used both for the Easter Fires pageant and for Easter sunrise services. It was designated a Recorded Texas Historic Landmark 1976.

History

Architecture
The Vereins Kirche, the Pioneer Museum Complex, Pioneer Memorial Library, and other architecture.

Churches and religion

Nimitz Hotel and National Museum of the Pacific War

Railway
On January 3, 1913, The San Antonio, Fredericksburg and Northern Railway was chartered to connect Fredericksburg with the San Antonio and Aransas Pass Railway near Waring. The cost of the tunnel sent the railroad into receivership on October 28, 1914. It was sold under foreclosure on December 31, 1917, to Martin Carle who deeded the property to the Fredericksburg and Northern Railway, which had been chartered on December 26 of that year. The train operated until July 27, 1942. Since the shutdown of the railway the tunnel has become a bat cave, hosting over 3 million Mexican free-tailed bats. In 2012 it became Old Tunnel State Park, with provides picnic and restroom facilities for visitors.

Agritourism
The Fredericksburg-Stonewall area has become known as the Peach Capital of Texas  and Benjamin Lester Enderle is known as the Father of the Hill Country Peach Industry. He was Gillespie County Surveyor and a math and science teacher at Fredericksburg High School when he planted five peach trees and began selling the fruit in 1921. Enderle worked to develop the Hale, Burbank, Elberta, and Stark varieties. Growers claim the taste is due to the area having the right combination of elevation, sandy soil, and climate to produce flavorful clingstone and freestone peaches. The fruit ripens May–August, and consumers can either buy picked fruit, or pick their own.

Herb farms, grape culture, lavender production, and wildflower seeds have become burgeoning businesses in Fredericksburg. Combinations of agribusiness with day spas, wedding facilities, or bed-and-breakfast accommodations are not unusual. Even a Texas Hill Country Lavender Trail has been designated.

Lady Bird Johnson's passion for Texas wildflowers not only lives on in the Lady Bird Johnson Wildflower Center in Austin, but also sparked a high demand for seed.  The  Wildseed Farms in Fredericksburg was founded by John R. Thomas in 1983 as a result of that high demand, and produces 88 varieties of wildflower seeds. It is the largest family-owned wildflower seed farm in the United States and host of an annual Wildflower Celebration.

In 1994, the Seventy-third Texas Legislature passed H.B. No. 1425, allowing brewpub operations within Texas. Fredericksburg Brewing Company began operations shortly thereafter.
A number of vineyards and related industries have also arisen in the post-LBJ era of Fredericksburg. The designated American Viticultural Areas of Fredericksburg in the Texas Hill Country AVA and the much larger Texas Hill Country AVA both include Fredericksburg inside their boundaries. Fredericksburg is a common starting point or destination for tourists visiting wineries in the Texas Hill Country.

Education
The city of Fredericksburg is served by the Fredericksburg Independent School District. The school's teams are called the "Battlin' Billies".

The first institute of higher learning in Fredericksburg was Fredericksburg College in 1876.  The German Methodist Church of Fredericksburg founded the institution and offered courses in the arts, sciences, and foreign languages. Enrollment was about 150 students. W. J. R. Thoenssen was the first principal, succeeded by Charles F. Tansill.  Finances caused the college to be closed in 1884.  The property was sold to Fredericksburg Independent School District.

For higher education, Fredericksburg is home to Texas Tech University at Fredericksburg.

It also has some private schools, such as:
 Ambleside School of Fredericksburg
 Fredericksburg Christian School
 Heritage Family School
 St. Mary's Elementary and Junior High School

Fredericksburg has a municipally operated library adjacent to the Gillespie County Courthouse.

Friends of Gillespie County Country Schools
Headquartered in Fredericksburg, the Friends of Gillespie County Country Schools is a group of former students and members of the community, interested in preserving the traditions of the old country schools, the community clubs, and the history of Gillespie County for future generations.

Hospitals
Hill Country Memorial Hospital on Highway 16 is an acute-care facility that offers medical care, preventive care, and a wellness center. It is consistently ranked in the top 100 hospitals in the nation.

Transportation

Major roads
U.S. Highway 290
U.S. Highway 87
Texas State Highway 16
Ranch Road 1631
Farm to Market Road 965

Airport
The airport was established by Hans Hannemann and Red Schroeder. Prior to 1945, the facility had been owned by the United States Army Air Corps. Transient and long-term hangar rentals are available.

Climate
Fredericksburg experiences a humid subtropical climate, with hot summers and generally mild winters.

Demographics

2020 census

As of the 2020 United States census, there were 10,875 people, 4,796 households, and 2,823 families residing in the city.

2000 census
As of the census of 2000, 8,911 people, 3,784 households, and 2,433 families resided in the city. The population density was 1,342.1 people per square mile (518.2/km2). The 4,183 housing units averaged 630.0 per square mile (243.2/km2). The racial makeup of the city was 93.08% White, 0.27% African American, 0.27% Native American, 0.19% Asian, 0.04% Pacific Islander, 5.09% from other races, and 1.05% from two or more races. Hispanics or Latinos of any race were 17.00% of the population. English is spoken by 72.73% of the population, Spanish by 14.77%, and Texas German by 12.48%. In terms of ancestry, 39.7% were of German, 12.5% were of Irish, 10.8% were of English, 4.9% were of American, 3.2% were of Scotch-Irish, 2.3% were of Scottish, 2.3% were of Dutch.

Of the 3,784 households, 23.9% had children under the age of 18 living with them, 53.2% were married couples living together, 8.5% had a female householder with no husband present, and 35.7% were not families. About 32.4% of all households were made up of individuals, and 19.6% had someone living alone who was 65 years of age or older. The average household size was 2.24 and the average family size was 2.82.

In the city, the population was distributed as 20.3% under the age of 18, 6.0% from 18 to 24, 20.8% from 25 to 44, 22.6% from 45 to 64, and 30.3% who were 65 years of age or older. The median age was 47 years. For every 100 females, there were 81.4 males. For every 100 females age 18 and over, there were 78.2 males.

The median income for a household in the city was $32,276, and for a family was $43,670. Males had a median income of $25,878 versus $22,171 for females. The per capita income for the city was $18,788. About 7.5% of families and 11.9% of the population were below the poverty line, including 16.1% of those under age 18 and 11.5% of those age 65 or over.

Government
The city of Fredericksburg is run under the council-manager form of government. As per the Home Rule Charter adopted May 1991, the governing body of Fredericksbug consists of a mayor and four council members. Both the mayor and the council are elected in alternating years by the city at large for two-year terms with a limit of four consecutive terms.

Mayor
Jeryl Hoover

Council Members
 Bobby Watson
 Emily Eppright Kirchner
 Tony Klein
 TBD

Media communications

Radio
AM Radio station KNAF went on the air in 1947.  The original license was granted by the Federal Communications Commission to Arthur Stehling.
The license was transferred to Norbert Fritz and family.

Newspapers
The Fredericksburg Standard was originally titled Gillespie County News and founded in 1888. The name change happened in 1907.  The paper was purchased by the Fredericksburg Publishing Company in 1915, which also published the German language newspaper Fredericksburg Wochenblatt.  The Radio Post began publishing in 1922 and was purchased in 1984 by the Fredericksburg Publishing Company.  The two newspapers merged into the Fredericksburg Standard-Radio Post.

In popular culture
 Film:
 Baghdad Texas (2009) filmed in Fredericksburg and Kerrville, Texas 
 Seven Days in Utopia (2011) filmed at the Boot Ranch golf club just north of Fredericksburg, as well as in Utopia, Texas, and featuring Academy Award-winner Robert Duvall and Lucas Black. It was based on the book  Golf's Sacred Journey: Seven Days at the Links of Utopia, Grand Rapids: Zondervan, 2009. .
 Music:
 "Stoned" (1995) a song by Old 97's advises 'Take a Greyhound to Fredericksburg'
 "Chester Nimitz Oriental Garden Waltz" (1988) a song by the Austin Lounge Lizards
 Grammy-winning blues artist Johnny Nicholas runs the Hill Top Cafe on US87 near Fredericksburg in a 1930s former gas station
 Books:
Early 1932 saw author Robert E. Howard taking one of his frequent trips around Texas. He traveled through the southern part of the state with his main occupation being, in his own words, "the wholesale consumption of tortillas, enchiladas and cheap Spanish wine." In Fredericksburg, while overlooking sullen hills through a misty rain, he conceived of the prehistoric fantasy land of Cimmeria, the bitter hard northern region home to fearsome barbarians. In February, while in Mission, he wrote the poem Cimmeria. It was also during this trip that Howard first conceived of the character of Conan the Barbarian.
  During the Civil War, young Louisa is the youngest daughter in a German household in Fredericksburg.  One brother has been killed by Confederate vigilantes James P. Waldrip and Die Haengebande, and the other brother is in a Union prison.
  Lawyer Beck Hardin returns to his hometown of Fredericksburg after the death of his wife, helping to solve an old crime.
 Comedy:
Bill Hicks referenced Fredericksburg in the bit "Gifts of Forgiveness" which was included on his 1997 posthumously released comedy album Rant In E-Minor
 Radio:
Walter de Paduwa on his Dr Boogie radio show of 11/11/2016 described (in French) his 1990s visit to Fredericksburg eating sauerkraut at 35 degrees, and seeing the Nimitz statue but summing up with the somewhat sweeping advice N'allez jamais a Fredericksburg. Il n'y a RIEN a voir a Frederiksburg (Never go to Fredericksburg. There is NOTHING to see at Fredericksburg).

Notable people

Gallery

See also
 Fredericksburg Theater Company
 Fredericksburg in the Texas Hill Country AVA
 Adelsverein
 Central Texas Electric Cooperative
 Cherry Springs Dance Hall
 Easter Fire
 German Texan
 Loyal Valley
 Meusebach Homesite
 List of museums in Central Texas
 Sisterdale, Texas
 Texas Hill Country
 Wrede School

Notes

References

Further reading

External links

 Old Tunnel Bat Habitat TPWD
 City of Fredericksburg website
 
 Official Tourism Website of the Fredericksburg, TX Convention & Visitors Bureau
Old Tunnel State Park / Texas Parks and Wildlife

 
Cities in Texas
Cities in Gillespie County, Texas
County seats in Texas
German-American culture in Texas
German-American history
Populated places established in 1846
1846 establishments in Texas